The Zachry-Kingston House, in Morgan County, Georgia, near Buckhead, was built in 1830.  It was listed on the National Register of Historic Places in 1987.

It is a two-story wood frame Plantation plain-style house with Federal detailing.  It was restored in 1985.

It is located at 6030 Bethany Road, near the Oconee River in southeast Morgan County.

It is located directly on County Dirt Road No. 143.

References

Plantation Plain architecture
National Register of Historic Places in Morgan County, Georgia
Houses completed in 1830